Gray County Courthouse may refer to:

 Gray County Courthouse (Kansas), Cimmaron, Kansas
 Old Gray County Courthouse, Cimarron, Kansas
 Gray County Courthouse (Texas), Pampa, Texas